The 2010 CIS Men's Final 8 Basketball Tournament was held March 19–21, 2010. It was the last of three consecutive CIS Championships to be held at Scotiabank Place in Ottawa, Ontario and was hosted by the Carleton Ravens. The host Ravens were seeking to win their seventh championship in eight years. The tournament was broadcast on TSN2, which led to controversy over its tape delay of one semi-final and over blocking on-line access to game broadcast.  

The University of Saskatchewan Huskies won their first CIS basketball championship, with a 91-81 victory over the University of British Columbia Thunderbirds. The Huskies defeated the number one ranked Carleton Ravens in the semi-final. It was UBC's second consecutive loss in the championship game, after losing to Carleton in the previous year's final.

Championship Bracket

Consolation Bracket

Note: All records are against CIS competition only.

Game Reports
 Calgary 82-74 Cape Breton
 UBC 79-58 Lakehead
 Saskatchewan 71-68 Windsor
 Carleton 83-72 UQAM
 Cape Breton 87-65 Lakehead
 Windsor 79-74 UQAM
 UBC 77-63 Calgary
 Saskatchewan 86-82 Carleton
Saskatchewan 91-81 UBC

References

External links
 CIS Blog Capsule Preview

2010
2009–10 in Canadian basketball
Sports competitions in Ottawa